Characidium fasciatum, the darter characin,  is a fish in the family Characidae.

References

Characidae
Taxa named by Johannes Theodor Reinhardt
Fish described in 1867